Inder Singh Namdhari (born 11 September 1942) is an Indian politician.  He was a member of the Indian Parliament, and represented Chatra (Lok Sabha constituency).

He won the 2009 Indian general election as an Independent candidate, with support from the Bharatiya Janata Party and was first Vidhan sabha speaker of Jharkhand. He was prominent leader of Vanachal state movement which demanded separate state for south Bihar.

References

External links
 
 nocorruption
 Detailed Profile: Shri Inder Singh Namdhari

1942 births
Living people
Punjabi people
Indian Sikhs
India MPs 2009–2014
Speakers of the Jharkhand Legislative Assembly
Members of the Jharkhand Legislative Assembly
Members of the Bihar Legislative Assembly
Lok Sabha members from Jharkhand
Bharatiya Janata Party politicians from Jharkhand
Independent politicians in India
Janata Dal (United) politicians from Jharkhand
Rashtriya Janata Dal politicians